Miccolamia is a genus of longhorn beetles of the subfamily Lamiinae, containing the following species:

subgenus Isomiccolamia
 Miccolamia glabricula Bates, 1884
 Miccolamia inspinosa Takakuwa & N. Ohbayashi, 1995
 Miccolamia kaniei Takakuwa & N. Ohbayashi, 1992
 Miccolamia takakuwai Hasegawa & N. Ohbayashi, 2001
 Miccolamia tuberculata (Pic, 1918)
 Miccolamia tuberculipennis Breuning, 1947
 Miccolamia verrucosa Bates, 1884
 Miccolamia yakushimensis Hasegawa & N. Ohbayashi, 2001

subgenus Laomiccolamia
 Miccolamia laosensis Breuning, 1962
 Miccolamia thailandensis Breuning & Chujo, 1966

subgenus Miccolamia
 Miccolamia albosetosa Gressitt, 1951
 Miccolamia bicristata Pesarini & Sabbadini, 1997
 Miccolamia binodosa Pic, 1935
 Miccolamia cleroides Bates, 1884
 Miccolamia dracuncula Gressitt, 1942
 Miccolamia relucens Holzschuh, 2003
 Miccolamia rugosula Holzschuh, 2003
 Miccolamia savioi Gressitt, 1940

References

Desmiphorini